Marble Hill Park is an area of  of parkland in Twickenham, in the London Borough of Richmond upon Thames. It is an English Heritage site that surrounds Marble Hill House, a Palladian villa originally built for Henrietta Howard, the mistress of King George II in 1724–29.

From 2004 to 2006 the park was a venue for open-air music events organised by the Jazz Cafe. On 26 August 2006, Irish vocal pop band Westlife held a concert for their Face to Face Tour supporting their album Face to Face.

The park is Grade II* listed on the Register of Historic Parks and Gardens.

In 2015–16 Historic England carried out a programme of research into the development of the park, including examining the early and mid 18th-century garden designs.

See also
Marble Hill House

References

External links
 Alexander Magnus. "Reconstructing the Parkland at Marble Hill House",  Historic Research

1720s establishments in England
English Heritage sites in London
Grade II* listed parks and gardens in London
Parks and open spaces in the London Borough of Richmond upon Thames
Twickenham